Actiniceps is a genus of fungi in the Pterulaceae family. It has a widespread distribution in tropical regions.

Species

References

External links

Pterulaceae
Agaricales genera